William Conybeare may refer to:

 William Conybeare (geologist) (1787–1857), English geologist
 William Conybeare (author) (1815–1857), English author, his son
 William Conybeare (Provost of Southwell) (1871–1955), English priest